Farmer's Bank, also known as the McCormick Messenger Building, is a historic bank building located at McCormick in McCormick County, South Carolina.  It was built about 1911, and is a two-story frame and brick building with Classical Revival design elements.  The first floor storefront is encompassed by a large rounded arch with radiating voussoirs and quoins.

It was listed on the National Register of Historic Places in 1985.

References 

Bank buildings on the National Register of Historic Places in South Carolina
Neoclassical architecture in South Carolina
Commercial buildings completed in 1911
Buildings and structures in McCormick County, South Carolina
National Register of Historic Places in McCormick County, South Carolina
1911 establishments in South Carolina